Tancred was a salvage rescue tugboat operated by the Royal Navy (RN) between 1943 and September 1944  before being transferred to Australia. She was broken up in 1983.

Construction
She was laid down on 3 September 1942 by Gulfport Boiler & Welding Works, Port Arthur, Texas and launched on 1 January 1943

Operational history
Commissioned as Tancred (W-104) under lend-lease on 18 February 1943 and served in the Atlantic Ocean. Transferred to Australia on 2 September 1944 she was operated by the Australian Commonwealth Marine Salvage Board until she returned to the custody of the United States Navy on 2 September 1945 and again retransferred back to Australia on the same day.

Tancred served until 2 August 1948, when she was again returned to the custody of the United States and was sold to Australia on 5 August 1948. She served with newly created Australian Salvage Board from 1949 and was later sold to the Department of Marine and Harbours, South Australia based at Port Adelaide.

Fate
Tancred was broken up in 1983. Her wheelhouse is on display at the Austbuilt Maritime Museum, Peterhead.

References

https://passengers.history.sa.gov.au/node/937145

Tugboats of Australia
1943 ships